The Old Fashioned Way is a 1934 American comedy film produced by Paramount Pictures. The film was directed by William Beaudine and stars W. C. Fields. The script was written by Jack Cunningham based on a story by "Charles Bogle" (one of Fields's writing pseudonyms).

Plot
In 1897, a blustery actor-manager, "The Great McGonigle" (W. C. Fields), and his traveling theater troupe is perpetually underfunded and always just a step ahead of the law and creditors. McGonigle's daughter Betty (Judith Allen) is loyal to her father, and she tries to discourage a suitor named Wally Livingston (Joe Morrison), telling him he should follow his own father's wishes and go to college instead of trying to become an actor. Along with the rest of the troupe is McGonigle's rather dim-witted assistant Marmaduke (Tammany Young).

Wally's wealthy father (Oscar Apfel) arrives in the town where the troupe is scheduled to perform a Victorian melodrama, William H. Smith's popular temperance play, The Drunkard. One of the players has resigned, and Wally wins the part, affording him a chance to act and also to perform a couple of songs in his strong tenor voice. His father is impressed by his son's talent, and his skepticism about Betty is eased when he learns that she has been trying to get Wally to return to college.

McGonigle has an eye on Cleopatra Pepperday (Jan Duggan), a wealthy and untalented widow, and her infant son (Baby LeRoy), and exploits her to stave off the local sheriff, who is Pepperday's boyfriend. To secure her support, McGonigle promises her a cameo role in The Drunkard, with one line: "Here comes the prince." The play has no reference to any prince of course, and act after act comes and goes with her rehearsing her line in fond hope, but her cue never comes. At the end of the play, distraught and crying, she goes off to get the sheriff. After the play concludes, McGonigle comes onstage and performs a juggling act.

McGonigle then learns that the troupe's sponsor is canceling the tour, due to poor advance reports. McGonigle tells Betty and Wally that he has decided to close the show and to seek his fortune in New York City. The bride and groom and his father ride the train back to the Livingston home, and Betty gets a telegram from her father stating that things are going well in the big city. In reality, McGonigle has become a snake-oil salesman.

Cast

W. C. Fields as The Great McGonigle / Squire Cribbs in 'The Drunkard'
Joe Morrison as Wally Livingston / William Dowton in 'The Drunkard'
Baby LeRoy as Albert Pepperday
Judith Allen as Betty McGonigle / Agnes Dowton in 'The Drunkard'
Jan Duggan as Cleopatra Pepperday
Tammany Young as Marmaduke Gump
Nora Cecil as Mrs. Wendelschaffer
Lew Kelly as Sheriff Walter Jones
Jack Mulhall as Dick Bronson, resigning actor
Oscar Apfel as Mr. Livingston
Samuel Ethridge as Bartley Neuville / Edward Middleton / The Drunkard in 'The Drunkard'
Ruth Marion as Agatha Sprague / Mary Wilson in 'The Drunkard'
Richard Carle as Sheriff of Barnesville
Larry Grenier as Drover Stevens in 'The Drunkard'
William Blatchford as Landlord in 'The Drunkard'
Jeffrey Williams as Mrs. Arden Renclelaw in 'The Drunkard'
Donald Brown as The Minister in 'The Drunkard'

Production notes
Fields' "Great McGonigle" character—a riff on the Great Ziegfeld—is rather similar to the carnival operator types he would later play in 1936's Poppy and 1939's You Can't Cheat an Honest Man.

The play depicted in the film, is the American temperance play The Drunkard; or, The Fallen Saved, first performed in 1844. A drama in five acts, it was perhaps the most popular play produced in the United States before the dramatization of Uncle Tom's Cabin in the 1850s. In New York City, P.T. Barnum presented it at his American Museum in a run of over 100 performances. It was among the first of the American temperance plays, and remained the most popular of them until it was eclipsed in 1858 by T. S. Arthur's Ten Nights in a Bar-Room. As the film's centerpiece, the sequence runs about 20 minutes and is performed in the style of the late 1890s. Reaction shots show audience members at a pitch of emotional involvement: an excited elderly spectator is cautioned by his wife to think of his heart; a young sophisticate skeptically asks his pretty date, "Do you think this is a good play?" to which she answers rapturously, eyes glued to the stage, "Oh, yes!" For the 1930s, the film is unusual in that it does not mock but instead nostalgically celebrates the enthusiasm 1890s American small-town audiences had for traveling theatrical companies of all sorts.

McGonigle's juggling act seen in the film affords a rare opportunity to observe Fields's own juggling talent—his famous vaudeville specialty—as he juggles airborne balls and cigar boxes. In this bit, Fields looks relatively fit and slim, in contrast to the plumper look that became part of his trademark in later years.

References

External links

1934 films
Films directed by William Beaudine
Films scored by John Leipold
Films with screenplays by W. C. Fields
American black-and-white films
American comedy films
1934 comedy films
Paramount Pictures films
1930s English-language films
1930s American films